Alassio is a town and comune in the province of Savona situated in the western coast of Liguria, Northern Italy, approximately  from the French border.

Alassio is known for its natural and scenic views. The town centre is crossed by a pedestrianised cobbled road known as the Budello.

The town has sandy beaches, blue sea and many bars and restaurants on the sea front. Alassio has also a pier known as "Molo di Alassio" or "Pontile Bestoso" which offers views of the town. The town is famous for its "Muretto di Alassio", a wall with signatures onto coloured ceramic tiles.

Alassio is situated on the Riviera di Ponente coast, and it has a small tourist port (porticciolo) named "Luca Ferrari". It was also known as a health resort in winter and a bathing place in summer, and has many hotels.

Heritage  
The English composer Edward Elgar wrote a concert-overture called In the South (Alassio) whilst staying on holiday in Alassio in the winter of 1903–04.

Alassio is featured as the location for a holiday in the 1944 film The Children Are Watching Us.

The painter Felix Nussbaum (1904–1944) stayed in Alassio in 1934 and it appears on many of his lighter paintings. The painters Helen Frankenthaler and her husband Robert Motherwell summered and worked there in 1960.

International relations

Twin towns – Sister cities
Alassio is twinned with:
 La Thuile, Italy (2013)

References

Sources

External links

Alassio Travel Guide